Ricky Wong may refer to:

Ricky Wong (Malaysian businessman) (born 1981), Malaysian entrepreneur and founder of Asia Media
Ricky Wong (Hong Kong businessman) (born 1961), Hong Kong businessman
Ricky Wong, fictional character from the television series We Can Be Heroes: Finding the Australian of the Year